José-Thierry Goron (born 1 April 1977) in Martinique is a footballer who plays as a forward. He currently plays for Aiglon du Lamentin in the Martinique Championnat National and the Martinique national football team.

Club career
He has previously played for Case-Pilote, Club Franciscain, Rivière-Pilote and Golden Lion.

International career
He started his international career with Martinique national football team in 2002.

International goals
Scores and results list Martinique's goal tally first.

References

External links

1977 births
Living people
Martiniquais footballers
Martinique international footballers
Association football forwards
2014 Caribbean Cup players
Golden Lion FC players
Aiglon du Lamentin players